Stephen Hartley Dorff (born April 21, 1949) is an American songwriter and composer whose work is mainly in the field of country music.

Career 
Dorff has written several songs for other artists, including "Hypnotize the Moon" and "My Heart Will Never Know" for Clay Walker, "The Man in Love with You" and "I Cross My Heart" by George Strait, "Don't Underestimate My Love for You" by Lee Greenwood, "Every Which Way but Loose" by Eddie Rabbitt and "Through the Years" by Kenny Rogers. He also composed the themes for Spenser: For Hire, Murphy Brown, The Singing Bee, Just the Ten of Us and others.

In addition, Dorff was a co-writer of the song "I Just Fall in Love Again" with composers Larry Herbstritt, Harry Lloyd, and Gloria Sklerov. "I Just Fall in Love Again", originally recorded by The Carpenters but not released as a single, became a major pop hit for Anne Murray, peaking at #12 on the Billboard Top 100 in 1979. Steve Dorff also wrote the music score for the song "As Long As We Got Each Other" from the popular family TV sitcom Growing Pains, with John Bettis writing the lyrics. He collaborated with Bettis again on Josephine, a musical about singer Josephine Baker.

Dorff was the music supervisor for Pure Country (1992) and Pure Country 2: The Gift (2010). Since 2009, he has been the bandleader on the CMT revival of The Singing Bee, for which he also composed the theme music.

Dorff has been nominated for three Grammy Awards and five Emmy Awards. He was inducted into the Songwriters Hall of Fame in 2018.

Personal life and family 
Dorff is the father of actor Stephen Dorff and songwriter Andrew Dorff, who died at age 40 on December 19, 2016.

Filmography 
1982   Waltz Across Texas
1982	Honkytonk Man
1985	Rustlers' Rhapsody
1987	Back to the Beach
1987	My Best Friend Is a Vampire
1989	Pink Cadillac
1992	Pure Country
1995   Breaking Free
1996   Coyote Summer
1996   The Undercover Kid
1997   Lunker Lake
1998	Dancer, Texas Pop. 81
1999	Blast from the Past
1999	Dudley Do-Right
2000   The Cactus Kid
2002	Mi Amigo
2008   Jake's Corner
2010	Pure Country 2: The Gift
2017   The Meanest Man in Texas

References

External links 

1949 births
20th-century American composers
20th-century American Jews
20th-century American male musicians
20th-century American pianists
21st-century American composers
21st-century American Jews
21st-century American male musicians
21st-century American pianists
American country pianists
American country songwriters
American film score composers
American male composers
American male film score composers
American male pianists
American male songwriters
Composers from New York City
Country musicians from New York (state)
Jewish American film score composers
Living people
Musicians from New York City
Songwriters from New York (state)